Lukas Florian David (5 June 1934 – 11 October 2021) was an Austrian classical violinist.

Life 
David was born in Wels upper Austria in 1934 as the younger son of the composer and conductor Johann Nepomuk David (1895–1977) and his wife Berta Eybl. His older brother was the composer and conductor Thomas Christian David (1925–2006). He received his first violin lessons at the University of Music and Theatre Leipzig. Later he was a student of Max Strub at the Mozarteum University Salzburg and of Max Kergl at the State University of Music and Performing Arts Stuttgart. He had his first public performance at the age of 14. From 1949 to 1957, he studied in the master class of Tibor Varga and was his assistant at the Hochschule für Musik Detmold until 1959. He also attended a master class with Nathan Milstein.

As a violinist he gained international recognition; concert tours took him through Europe, to Asia, the US, South America and South Africa. The main focus of his work is the romantic and contemporary repertoire, so he also performed several of his father's solo concertos. In the Peruvian capital Lima he organised the annual Lukas David Chamber Music Festival. In Oesterreichisches Musiklexikon. Online-edition, Vienna 2002 ff., ; Print-edition: Vol. 1, Publishing House of the Austrian Academy of Sciences, Vienna 2002, .</ref>

From 1959, David led a main subject class at the University of Music and Performing Arts Vienna. From 1966 to 1998 he was professor at the Hochschule für Musik Detmold.

David died on 11 October 2021 in Lemgo, Germany.

 Further reading 
 Carl Dahlhaus, Hans Heinrich Eggebrecht (ed.): Brockhaus-Riemann-Musiklexikon. In vier Bänden und einem Ergänzungsband. Vol. 1: A–D. 2nd, revised and extended edition, Schott, Mainz 1995, .
 Franz Farga: Geigen und Geiger. Mit 158 teils ganzseitigen Bildern im Text. 5. improved and supplemented edition, A. Müller, Rüschlikon-Zürich 1960, .
 Marc Honegger (ed.): Das grosse Lexikon der Musik. Vol. 2: C bis Elmendorff. Herder, Freiburg im Breisgau among others 1982, .
 Axel Schiederjürgen (Red.): Kürschners Musiker-Handbuch. Solisten, Dirigenten, Komponisten, Hochschullehrer''. 5th edition, Saur, Munich 2006, .

References

External links 
 
 
 

1934 births
2021 deaths
Austrian classical violinists
Academic staff of the University of Music and Performing Arts Vienna
People from Wels